Captain Crunch may refer to:

Cap'n Crunch, a brand of breakfast cereal and its identically-named cartoon mascot
John Draper, a phone phreaker who used Captain Crunch as an alias
Chris Pronger, a hockey player with that nickname